Jadreški is a village in the municipality of Ližnjan, in northern Istria in Croatia. In 2011 it had a population of 501.

References

Populated places in Istria County